Félix Charles Oudart (1881–1956) was a French stage and film actor.

Selected filmography
 Crainquebille (1922)
 Abduct Me (1932)
 Toto (1933)
 George and Georgette (1934)
 A Day Will Come (1934)
 Merchant of Love (1935)
 Excursion Train (1936)
 Seven Men, One Woman (1936)
 Miarka (1937)
 Lights of Paris (1938)
 I Was an Adventuress (1938)
 The Five Cents of Lavarede (1939)
 The Porter from Maxim's (1939)
 Serenade (1940)
 A Woman in the Night (1943)
 Dorothy Looks for Love (1945)
 Dropped from Heaven (1946)
 Impeccable Henri (1948)
 Emile the African (1949)
 At the Grand Balcony (1949)
 Eve and the Serpent (1949)
 The Straw Lover (1951)
 Atoll K (1951)
 Life Is a Game (1951)
 La demoiselle et son revenant (1952)
 Naked in the Wind (1953)
 Au diable la vertu (1954)

References

Bibliography
 Goble, Alan. The Complete Index to Literary Sources in Film. Walter de Gruyter, 1999.

External links

1881 births
1956 deaths
French male film actors
French male silent film actors
20th-century French male actors
Mass media people from Lille